Richard B Wyatt (birth and death details unknown) was a noted amateur cricketer in the late 18th century.  His career spanned the 1789 to 1797 seasons, during which he played 18 first-class cricket matches, mainly for Essex.

Wyatt was primarily a batsman who scored a total of 288 runs in 33 innings with a highest score of 39.  He was an occasional bowler and is credited with 5 wickets.  He made 21 catches.

References

Further reading
 Arthur Haygarth, Scores & Biographies, Volume 1 (1744-1826), Lillywhite, 1862

English cricketers
English cricketers of 1787 to 1825
Essex cricketers
Marylebone Cricket Club cricketers
Hornchurch Cricket Club cricketers
White Conduit Club cricketers
Old Etonians cricketers
Year of birth unknown
Year of death unknown